The Tupolev Tu-124 (NATO reporting name: Cookpot) is a 56-passenger short-range twinjet airliner built in the Soviet Union. It was the first Soviet airliner powered by turbofan engines.

Design and development

Developed from the medium-range Tupolev Tu-104, the Tu-124 was meant to meet Aeroflot's requirement for a regional airliner to replace the Ilyushin Il-14 on domestic routes. Resembling a 75% scaled-down Tu-104, the two were hard to tell apart at a distance but it was not a complete copy of the Tu-104. The Tu-124 had a number of refinements, including double-slotted flaps, a large centre-section airbrake and automatic spoilers. Unlike the Tu-104, the wing trailing edge inboard of the undercarriage was unswept.

The Tu-124 had a drogue parachute to be used in an emergency landing or landing on a slippery surface and had low pressure tires for operation from unpaved airfields. As on the Tu-104 the engines were installed in the wing roots, but the turbofan engines used less fuel. The installation of the engines close to the fuselage allowed vibrations to be more readily transmitted to the cabin, which reduced passenger comfort, and also reduced the fatigue life of the wing assembly.

The standard seating of the basic version was 44 seats. The first of two prototype, SSSR-45000 (C/N 0350101) made its first flight from Zhukovsky airfield on 24 March 1960. The second prototype, SSSR-45001 (C/N 0350102), followed in June 1960. Two other airframes served as a static test cells. Testing was successful, and the aircraft entered production at Factory 135 at Kharkiv, Ukraine, replacing the Tu-104 in production. Deliveries to Aeroflot began in August 1962, with the type operating its first scheduled passenger service, between Moscow and Tallinn in Estonia, on 2 October 1962.

Operational history
Aeroflot was impressed with the flight performance of the Tu-124 and used it on domestic routes from the end of 1962.

The improved Tu-124V, which could seat 56 passengers instead of the 44 of the original model, and which had increased range and maximum takeoff weight, came into service in 1964. An Aeroflot Tu-124V was exhibited at the 1965 Paris Air Show. Despite the aircraft's low purchase price (stated as $1.45 million in 1965) and low operating costs, few were exported, with Československé Státní Aerolinie (ČSA) and the East German airline Interflug being the only airlines other than Aeroflot that bought the Tu-124 new, although ČSA sold its surviving Tu-124s to Iraqi Airways for use on VIP flights in 1973. Interflug used its three Tu-124s as an alternative to the Ilyushin Il-62, when the Il-62s were grounded due to mechanical issues. All three were sold back to the Soviet Union in 1975.

Three airframes were completed in 1966 in a VIP configuration, and designated Tu-124K. However, Aeroflot never placed them into service, and they were purchased by the Indian Air Force.

A number were also sold to military users, including the Soviet Air Force, which used them as navigational trainers, and to the Chinese Air Force.

A total of 164 Tu-124s were built. Issues with the safety of the Tu-104 affected the fate of the Tu-124, although the reliability of the Tu-124 was slightly better. Production ended in 1965 and Aeroflot decommissioned its last twelve Tu-124s on 21 January 1980. The Tu-124 continued in operation for some years with the Soviet Air Force and in Iraq, but all aircraft were withdrawn before and in 1990, The ones in Iraq military and Iraqi Airways were destroyed in early 1990s during the Gulf War.

Several Tu-124s have been preserved. One is in the museum of the Kharkiv State Aircraft Manufacturing Company (formerly the Tu-124 manufacturer Factory 135), another is in China's Datangshan aviation museum in Beijing, another at the Central Air Force Museum at Monino outside Moscow. A Tu-124K is on display at New Delhi Airport and next to the State Museum at Lucknow Zoo.

Competition within the COMECON 
The German Democratic Republic attempted to compete within the COMECON trade bloc with its own four-engined design called the Baade 152. The design was unsuccessful, leading Interflug to buy a rear-engined development of the Tu-124, the Tupolev Tu-134.

Variants 

Tu-124/Tu-124V
The first production variant. International demand was small, as most foreign airlines were waiting to buy the improved Tupolev Tu-134
Tu-124B
Three prototypes with D-20P-125 engines, built in 1963
Tu-124K/Tu-124K2
VIP configuration operated by the militaries of Iraq and China, and by the Indian Air Force
Tu-124Sh-1
Military version used as navigator trainer
Tu-124Sh-2
Military version used as navigator trainer
Tu-127
Proposed military transport version, not built.

Former operators

Former civil operators 

 ČSA

 Interflug (operated in Interflug colours, but owned by the East German Air Force)

 Iraqi Airways

 Aeroflot

Former military operators 

 People's Liberation Army Air Force

 Czechoslovakian Air Force

 East German Air Force

 Indian Air Force  [three Tu-124K VIP variants]

 Iraqi Air Force

 Soviet Air Force

Accidents and incidents
A total of fifteen Tu-124s were written off in crashes during the type's operational career; another two aircraft of Iraqi Airways were destroyed on the ground during the Gulf War.

1960s
21 August 1963
Aeroflot Flight 366, a Tu-124 (СССР-45021), ditched in the Neva River in Leningrad (now Saint Petersburg) after both engines failed due to fuel exhaustion while the crew was preoccupied with landing gear problems; all 52 on board survived.

8 March 1965
Aeroflot Flight 513, a Tu-124 (СССР-45028), stalled and crashed shortly after takeoff from Kuybyshev Airport, killing 30 of 39 on board.

11 November 1965
Aeroflot Flight 99, a Tu-124V (СССР-45086), crashed on the frozen Lake Kilpyavr after the pilot mistook lights near Murmansk Airport for the runway threshold lights, killing 32 of 64 on board.

13 June 1966
An Aeroflot Tu-124 (СССР-45017) overran a wet runway on landing at Minsk-1 International Airport and was written off; no casualties.

27 July 1966
The aircraft was repaired and returned to service, but was lost in the crash of Aeroflot Flight 5484 in 1979.

7 March 1968
Aeroflot Flight 3153, a Tu-124 (СССР-45019), crashed on takeoff from Volgograd Airport after the crew accidentally activated the spoilers, killing a crew member; all 44 passengers survived. The spoiler switch had been poorly placed on the control column, allowing the pilot to hit it by accident.

1970s
29 January 1970
Aeroflot Flight 145, a Tu-124V (СССР-45083), struck a hillside while on approach to Kilpyavr Airport, Murmansk; of the 38 on board, five died on impact and another six died in the freezing temperatures while waiting for rescue.

18 August 1970
CSA Flight 744, a Tu-124V (OK-TEB), landed wheels-up at Kloten Airport after the pilot, preoccupied with a cabin pressurization problem, failed to hear the command to lower the landing gear; all 20 on board survived. The gear warning system alarm had been turned off.

2 September 1970
Aeroflot Flight 3630, a Tu-124 (СССР-45012), crashed near Dnepropetrovsk (now Dnipro) following an unexplained loss of control, killing all 37 on board.

9 July 1973 
Aeroflot Flight 5385, a Tu-124V (СССР-45062), suffered an uncontained failure of the right engine shortly after takeoff from Kuybyshev Airport. Debris from the engine penetrated the fuselage, killing two passengers and injuring another four. The crew began an emergency descent and the engine was shut down. Panicking passengers moved to the front of the cabin, causing the center of gravity to move forward, but flight attendants were able to get the passengers seated and the aircraft was able to land safely at Kuybyshev. The aircraft was repaired and returned to service.

20 November 1973
An Aeroflot Tu-124V (СССР-45031) overran a snow-covered runway on landing at Kazan Airport; no casualties.

16 December 1973
Aeroflot Flight 2022, a Tu-124V (СССР-45061), went into a spiraling dive at  while descending for Moscow due to a short circuit in the elevator trim system.

23 December 1973
Aeroflot Flight 5398, a Tu-124V (СССР-45044), crashed near Vinniki due to an in-flight fire following an engine failure, killing all 17 on board.

3 January 1976
Aeroflot Flight 2003, a Tu-124V (СССР-45037), crashed shortly after takeoff from Vnukovo Airport due to a loss of control following instrument failure after entering clouds, killing all 61 on board; one person on the ground also died when the aircraft struck several homes

5 November 1977
Indian Air Force Tu-124K V643, named Pushpak Rath (Floral Chariot), crashed in a paddy field near Jorhat after descending too low during the second attempt to land, killing five crew; Prime Minister Morarji Desai is among the survivors.

1977
Soviet Air Force Tu-124Sh 53 red landed wheels-up at Lugansk Airport after the pilot forgot to lower the landing gear; no casualties.

29 August 1979
Aeroflot Flight 5484, a Tu-124V (СССР-45038), went into a spin, broke apart in mid-air, and crashed near Kirsanov after a flap was accidentally extended, killing all 63 on board. This crash is the deadliest involving the Tu-124, and Aeroflot retired it afterwards.

1990s
February 1991
Two Iraqi Airways Tu-124Vs (YI-AEY and YI-AEL) were destroyed on the ground at Saddam International Airport by US or allied bombs during the Gulf War.

Specifications (Tu-124V)

See also

References 

 Duffy, Paul and Andrei Kandalov. Tupolev: The Man and His Aircraft. Shrewsbury, UK:Airlife Publishing, 1996. .
 Gunston, Bill. The Osprey Encyclopedia of Russian Aircraft 1875–1995. London:Osprey, 1995. .
 Stroud, John. Soviet Transport Aircraft since 1945. London:Putnam, 1968. .

External links 

Tu-0124
1960s Soviet airliners
Twinjets
Low-wing aircraft
Aircraft first flown in 1960